Shuko Aoyama and Eri Hozumi were the defending champions, but Aoyama chose not to participate. Hozumi partnered Junri Namigata, but lost in the final to Naomi Broady and Kristýna Plíšková, 6–3, 6–4.

Seeds

Draw

References 
 Draw

Fukuoka International Women's Cup - Doubles
Fukuoka International Women's Cup